The Return of October is a 1948 American comedy film directed by Joseph H. Lewis and starring Glenn Ford and Terry Moore.

Plot

Terry is a teenage girl whose Uncle Willy, a horse trainer, dreams of winning the Derby. He bets everything on his horse Sunset, then collapses and dies after it loses.

Now living with wealthy Aunt Martha, the girl is convinced that Uncle Willy has been reincarnated as a horse named October. A psychology professor, Bentley Bassett, writes a book about Terry, which is used in a sanity hearing against her by crooked relatives who want dying Aunt Martha's money.

Bassett uses college funds to help Terry buy the horse. They enter October in the Derby, where other bettors join them in cheering "Uncle Willy" to victory.

Cast

References 

Feature films, 1940-1949: A United States Filmography, by Alan G. Fetrow

External links 

1948 films
1948 comedy films
American comedy films
Columbia Pictures films
1940s English-language films
Films scored by George Duning
Films directed by Joseph H. Lewis
American horse racing films
Films about horses
1940s American films